Astralium pileolum, common name the cap trochis shell, is a species of sea snail, a marine gastropod mollusk in the family Turbinidae, the turban snails.

Description
The size of the shell varies between 28 mm and 65 mm. The shell resembles the shell of Bellastraea squamifera (Iredale, 1924), with some differences. The shell is grayish white. The sculpture is obsolete above and nearly so below. The keel is very broad and thin.

Distribution
This marine species is endemic to Australia and occurs off the Northern Territory, Queensland and Western Australia.

References

 Reeve, L.A. 1842. Conchologia Systematica or Complete System of Conchology: in which the Lepades and Conchiferous Mollusca are described and classified according to their natural organization and habits. London : Longman, Brown, Green & Longmans Vol. 2 337 pp., pls 131–300.
 Kiener, L.C. 1850. Spécies général et Iconographie des coquilles vivantes, comprenant la collection du Muséum d'histoire Naturelle de Paris, la collection de Lamarck, celle du Prince Massena (appartenant maintenant a M. le Baron B. Delessert) et les découvertes récentes des voyageurs. Paris : Ballière pls 1-27, 29–43, 45, 46, 50–52, 55, 56.
 Wilson, B.R. & Gillett, K. 1971. Australian Shells: illustrating and describing 600 species of marine gastropods found in Australian waters. Sydney : Reed Books 168 pp
 Wilson, B. 1993. Australian Marine Shells. Prosobranch Gastropods. Kallaroo, Western Australia : Odyssey Publishing Vol. 1 408 pp.
 Williams, S.T. (2007). Origins and diversification of Indo-West Pacific marine fauna: evolutionary history and biogeography of turban shells (Gastropoda, Turbinidae). Biological Journal of the Linnean Society, 2007, 92, 573–592
 Alf A. & Kreipl K. (2011) The family Turbinidae. Subfamilies Turbininae Rafinesque, 1815 and Prisogasterinae Hickman & McLean, 1990. In: G.T. Poppe & K. Groh (eds), A Conchological Iconography. Hackenheim: Conchbooks. pp. 1–82, pls 104–245.

External links
 

pileolum
Gastropods described in 1842